Mark Timlin (born 17 November 1994) is a retired Irish professional footballer that played for League of Ireland clubs Derry City, St Patrick's Athletic and Finn Harps.

Career

Early career
Timlin started his career with his local club Buncrana Hearts and at Scoil Mhuire, Buncrana before going on trial with English club Ipswich Town in July 2011, and impressed enough to secure a contract offer from the Tractor Boys.

Derry City
After 3 seasons with Ipswich reserves scoring 10 goals in 35 games, Timlin's contract came to an end and he made the move back home and went on trial with League of Ireland side Derry City. He impressed Derry boss Roddy Collins enough that he was signed within the week, just prior to the 2014 League of Ireland season. He missed the start of the season through injury but fought his way into the starting eleven following his comeback from injury and kept his place for the majority of the season, even under new manager Peter Hutton as Roddy Collins was sacked not long into the season. He started 18 league games over the season, scoring once, in a 4–2 win over Bohemians. Timlin featured in all four of Derry's Europa League games, scoring in a 4–0 home win over Welsh side Aberystwyth Town in the first qualifying round as his side advanced to face Shakhtyor Soligorsk of Belarus who knocked them out of the competition. He remained an unused substitute in the 2014 FAI Cup Final as Derry lost 2–0 to St Patrick's Athletic.

Timlin became one of City's main men in the 2015 League of Ireland season as they had a poor season, finishing seventh in the league after bad form saw them sack manager Peter Hutton and replace him with his assistant Paul Hegarty, as they were dragged into a relegation battle in the last third of the season. He scored many important goals in their relegation fight and finished the season as Derry's top goalscorer with 10 goals in the league from 28 appearances as well as one goal in the FAI Cup vs Edenderry Town and one in the League Cup against Sligo Rovers. He was also sent off twice against Sligo in the league. After his impressive from for Derry, Timlin attracted many clubs, including rivals St Patrick's Athletic and Shamrock Rovers. New Derry manager Kenny Shiels was also trying his utmost to keep Timlin at the club but was admitted it looked unlikely as he was looking to move onto the next step of his career.

St Patrick's Athletic
Timlin signed for Dublin club St Patrick's Athletic on 21 November 2015 for the upcoming 2016 season. He made his debut for Pats on the opening day of the 2016 League of Ireland season, soling off the bench as Pats we're shocked by a surprise 3–1 defeat to Galway United. Timlin's first goal for the Saints came in a 3–0 win over Dublin rivals Bohemians when he headed in an Ian Bermingham cross to open the scoring after 5 minutes at Richmond Park. Timlin finished up the season with 10 goals in 37 games in all competitions, earning his first senior medal by winning the 2016 League of Ireland Cup after a 4–1 win over Limerick in the Final. He also appeared in all four of the Saints UEFA Europa League games as they beat Luxembourg side Jeunesse Esch before being knocked out by Dinamo Minsk of Belarus.

Return to Derry
On 30 November 2016, Timlin returned to Derry City under manager Kenny Shiels on a one-year contract with the option of a second year.

Finn Harps
Timlin signed for Finn Harps on 28 July 2017 and in no time became Finn Harps solution which lead them back to the first division after a 1-year absence and a return to Donegal again. On 17 January 2023, Timlin announced his retirement from football citing persistent injuries as a deciding factor.

International career
Timlin was called up to the Republic of Ireland under-21 squad for a friendly with the Republic of Ireland Amateur squad on 21 February 2015.

Honours
 St Patrick's Athletic
League of Ireland Cup (1): 2016

Career statistics
Professional appearances – correct as of 17 January 2023.

References

External links

1994 births
Living people
Association footballers from County Donegal
Republic of Ireland association footballers
Derry City F.C. players
St Patrick's Athletic F.C. players
Finn Harps F.C. players
League of Ireland players
Association football midfielders
Republic of Ireland youth international footballers